Whitfield is an unincorporated community located in Rankin County, Mississippi, United States. The zip code is: 39193. The Mississippi State Hospital is located in Whitfield.

Notes

Unincorporated communities in Rankin County, Mississippi
Unincorporated communities in Mississippi